Srinkhal is a collection of short stories in the Assamese language written by Bhabendra Nath Saikia. The author received the Sahitya Akademi award for the collection in 1976.

The book contains 14 stories: 
Srinkhal [chain]
Suryoday [sunrise]
Chowkidar [watchman] 
Kritagya [grateful] 
Banaprastha [leaving the family]
Durbhikho [famine]
Balibhoj [picnic] 
Bandar [port] 
Pradhokshin [rotation] 
Akash [sky]
Chariali [crossroads]
Khabar [news] 
Barnana [: a woman's name] 
Raktim [blood-stained]

Trivia 
 Bhabendra Nath Saikia later made two Assamese cinema films Sandhyarag and Itihash from two stories of the book, namely  Banaprastha and  respectively.
 A stage play was made by Baharul Islam from Akash on 3 August 2007 at Rabindra Bhawan, Guwahati, and on 3 October 2007 at Pragjyoti. The play was invited to be performed for the forthcoming national theatre festival Bharangam to be held in January 2008 by the National School Of Drama, New Delhi.

Indian short story collections
Assamese-language books
Books from Assam
1976 short story collections